Cityfight may refer to:

Cityfight: Modern Combat in the Urban Environment, a 1979 board game
Codex Battlezone: Cityfight, a Warhammer 40,000 supplement

See also
Urban warfare